Yakov Grigoryevich Zhilinsky (27 March 1853 – 1918) was a Russian cavalry general, chief of staff of the Imperial Russian Army from 2 February 1911	to 4 March 1914. He was considered to be one of the main culprits of the failure of the East Prussian Campaign in the early stages of the First World War.

Biography
Zhilinsky was born on March 15, 1853, in Mikhaylov in the Ryazan Governorate. His family were nobility from the Smolensk Governorate, and he was born to Colonel Grigori I. Zhilinsky and Catherine Petrovna (née Muromtseva). In an early age, he attended the Gymnasium Creiman in Moscow.

He joined active service as a cadet in the Sumy Hussar Regiment. He was considered one of the best riders in the school and was in charge of training the regiment. 

In 1883, he graduated from Nikolaev Academy of the General Staff at the first category. For excellent success, he was promoted to captain. After serving as a senior aide to the staff of the 1st Grenadier Division, he served from 14 February 1894 on the Military Scientific Committee of the General Staff, a military intelligence organization responsible for the study of foreign countries.

During the Spanish–American War Zhilinsky was a Russian military observer with the Spanish Army in Cuba. On his return, he published a book on the war, which analyzed the causes of Spain's defeat. 

In 1899, Zhilinskiy served as a member of Russian delegation at the Hague Peace Conference. He was appointed commander of the 52nd Dragoons Regiment from August 1899. In 1900, he was promoted to the rank of major general and was appointed Quartermaster general.

In the Russo-Japanese War (1904–1905), Zhilinsky was Chief of Staff to the Viceroy of the Far East, Admiral Yevgeni Alexeyev, until Alexeyev was dismissed in October 1904. He remained in the combat zone to serve the Minister of War, Aleksey Kuropatkin until the end of the conflict. From 27 January 1906, he was commander of the 14th Cavalry Division in Poland, and from 7 July 1907 of the 10th Army Corps. Promoted to Cavalry general on 18 April 1910, Zhilinskiy was appointed commander of the Warsaw Military District and Governor-General of Warsaw in 1911.

Zhilinsky also served from 22 February 1911 to 4 March 1914 as Chief of the General Staff of the Imperial Russian Army. At the beginning of World War I, he assumed command of the Northwestern Front. The Northwestern Front included the 1st Army and 2nd Army under the command of General Paul von Rennenkampff and General Alexander Samsonov. After the unsuccessful East Prussian Campaign and the losses at the Battle of Tannenberg and the First Battle of the Masurian Lakes, he was relieved of command despite attempts to blame Rennenkampff for the fiasco. Zhilinsky was sent as a military representative to France from 1915 to 1916 and was recalled to Russia in the autumn of 1916. On 19 September 1917, he was ordered to retire.

After the October Revolution, he attempted to flee Russia but was killed in south Russia in undetermined circumstances.

Honors
 Order of St. Stanislaus, 3rd  degree, 1880.
 Order of St. Anne, 3rd degree, 1888
 Order of St. Stanislaus, 2nd  degree, 1894.
 Order of St. Anne, 2nd degree, 1896
 Order of St Vladimir, 4th degree, 1899
 Order of St Vladimir, 3rd degree, 1902
 Order of St. Stanislaus, 1st  degree with swords, 1904.
 Order of St. Anne, 1st degree with swords, 1905
 Order of St Vladimir, 2nd degree, 1906
 Order of the White Eagle, 1912
 Order of St. Alexander Nevsky, 1913

Notes

References

Kowner, Rotem. Historical Dictionary of the Russo-Japanese War. The Scarecrow Press (2006). 
Losher, John D. The Bolsheviks: Twilight of the Romanov Dynasty. Author House (2009)

External links
 Biography at firstworldwar.com

1853 births
1918 deaths
Executed people from Ryazan Oblast
Victims of Red Terror in Soviet Russia
Governors-General of Warsaw
Imperial Russian Army generals
Delegates to the Hague Peace Conferences
People from Mikhaylovsky District, Ryazan Oblast
Recipients of the Order of St. Anna
Recipients of the Order of St. Vladimir
Recipients of the Order of the White Eagle (Russia)
Recipients of the Order of Saint Stanislaus (Russian)
Russian military historians
Russian military personnel of the Russo-Japanese War
Russian military personnel of World War I